Lapeer station is an Amtrak station in Lapeer, Michigan currently served by the . The station was originally built in the early 1900s by the Grand Trunk Western Railroad, and renovated by Amtrak and the Michigan Department of Transportation in 1991 and completely restored in 2004. Another station in Lapeer formerly served the Michigan Central Railroad, but is now the office for an insurance company. The Amtrak station sits at a former junction of the GTW and MCRR lines, the latter of which is mostly removed, with the remaining piece now used by Lapeer Industrial Railroad.

From 1982–2004, the station was served by the International Limited, which was operated jointly by Via Rail and Amtrak and ran between Chicago and Toronto.

References

External links

Lapeer Amtrak Station (USA Rail Guide -- Train Web)
Station:  Lapeer, Michigan - GTW (Michigan's Internet Railroad History Museum )

See also
History of railroads in Michigan

Amtrak stations in Michigan
Buildings and structures in Lapeer County, Michigan
Railway stations in the United States opened in 1900
Former Grand Trunk Western Railroad stations